Livedo racemosa is a skin condition with persistent red or violet discoloration, characterised by a broken, branched, discontinuous and irregular pattern. It can be restricted to the limbs or diffuse. It is usually the first sign of a systemic vascular disorder.

See also 
 Livedo reticularis
 Livedoid dermatitis
 List of cutaneous conditions

References 

Vascular-related cutaneous conditions